Promachella is a genus of robber flies in the family Asilidae. There is at least one described species in Promachella, P. pilosa.

References

Further reading

 
 
 

Asilidae
Articles created by Qbugbot
Asilidae genera